Léa Jamelot (born 28 November 1992) is a French canoeist. She competed in the women's K-4 500 metres event at the 2016 Summer Olympics.

References

External links
 

1992 births
Living people
French female canoeists
Olympic canoeists of France
Canoeists at the 2016 Summer Olympics
Canoeists at the 2020 Summer Olympics
People from Obernai
European Games competitors for France
Canoeists at the 2015 European Games
Canoeists at the 2019 European Games
Competitors at the 2018 Mediterranean Games
Mediterranean Games competitors for France
Sportspeople from Bas-Rhin